The Hamburger Edition is the publishing house  of the Hamburg Institute for Social Research. It was established in the fall of 1994 with the aim of publishing results of the Institute's scholarship with the broader public in mind. In its over 20-year history, the Hamburger Edition published monographs, essays, and books by more than five hundred authors, many of whom served as members of the Institute while others came from a range of related disciplines in the German-speaking world, and internationally.

In the spring of 1995 the Hamburger Edition published its first nine books which defined the publishing program maintained consistently until today. They were monographs on nationalism and xenophobia , violence, Stalinism , and anti-Semitism. Also in 1995, the Hamburger Edition published the catalogue (in a book form) for an exhibit "Crimes of the German Wehrmacht: Dimensions of a War of Annihilation, 1941-1944" (Verbrechen der Wehrmacht. Dimensionen des Vernichtungskriegs 1941-1944), organized by the Institute.

Notes and references

Publishing companies of Germany
1994 establishments in Germany
Publishing companies established in 1994
Companies based in Hamburg